Only Side by Side with You is a 2018 Chinese television series based on the novel of the same name by Xiao Hu Ru Wei (小狐濡尾). It stars William Chan and Bai Baihe. The series premiered on Jiangsu TV and Zhejiang TV on March 25, 2018.

Synopsis
The series tells the story of Shi Yue, an ex-special force member but now the mysterious owner of a bar, who butts head with Nan Qiao when she was meeting potential investors at his bar after falling out with her cheating fiancée. Shi Yue discovers that Nan Qiao seems to be someone related to his past so he purposely gets close to her to find out more, ultimately falling for her in the process.

Cast

Production

Filming 
The series started filming in March 2017 at Shanghai and wrapped up in July 2017, taking a total of 113 days. About 400 quadcopters were employed for filming the set of the series.

Soundtrack

Ratings 
 In the table below, the blue numbers represent the lowest ratings and the red numbers represent the highest ratings.

Awards and nominations

International Broadcast
  Malaysia – Astro Shuang Xing (CH307 HD / CH324) – From 26 March 2018, Mondays to Fridays, 6 PM.

References

 

Chinese romance television series
2018 Chinese television series debuts
Television shows based on Chinese novels
Jiangsu Television original programming
Zhejiang Television original programming
Television series by Linmon Pictures
2018 Chinese television series endings